Chilukki (1997–2007) was an American Champion Thoroughbred racehorse, who during her racing career set two track records at Churchill Downs. She was bred in Kentucky by Dr. R. Smiser West and U.S. Racing Hall of Fame trainer MacKenzie Miller.

Background
Chilukki was out of the mare Song of Syria, a daughter of U.S. Racing Hall of Fame inductee Damascus. Sired by Cherokee Run, winner of the 1994 Breeders' Cup Sprint. The name Chilukki is taken from the Cherokee language term used by the Cherokee nation to describe themselves as dog people.

Purchased by Bob McNair's Stonerside Stable at  the 1999 Fasig-Tipton Two-Year-Olds in Training Sale in Florida, Chilukki was conditioned for racing by Bob Baffert.

Racing career
The filly had a brilliant two-year-old racing season, in which she set a Churchill Downs track record for 4.5 furlongs on April 28, 1999.  Her multiple wins that year included two Grade I stakes and she went into the 1999 Breeders' Cup Juvenile Fillies undefeated. However, she finished second  to the 33-1 long-shot  Cash Run. Despite this loss, Chilukki was voted the Eclipse Award as the American Champion Two-Year-Old Filly.

In 2000, the three-year-old Chilukki continued to win and set another new track record at Churchill downs in the one mile Churchill Downs Distaff Handicap, a race that was later renamed in her honor. Raced at age four, Chilukki won the January 2001 El Encino Stakes.

Breeding record
In March 2001 she was retired to serve as a broodmare at her owner's farm in Paris, Kentucky.

Chilukki died on May 7, 2007, at the Hagyard Equine Medical Institute near Lexington, Kentucky following complications after giving birth to a foal by the 2004 World Champion runner Ghostzapper. She was buried in her entirety in Stonerside Farm's equine cemetery.

References

1997 racehorse births
2007 racehorse deaths
Thoroughbred family 1-p
Racehorses bred in Kentucky
Racehorses trained in the United States
Eclipse Award winners